2B  or 2-B may refer to:
 2B (band), a Portuguese band
 2B (film), a 2009 science fiction film
 2B lead, a grading of pencil hardness
 2B (Nier: Automata), the video game's main protagonist
2b Theatre Company, a theatre company in Halifax, Nova Scotia
 2b2t, а Minecraft server with no rules
 Aerocondor, IATA airline code 2B
 Alpha-2B adrenergic receptor, a type of protein structure
 Haute-Corse, French department 2B (northern Corsica)
 Second baseman, a fielding position in baseball
 Double (baseball), a type of base hit
 Stalag II-B, a prisoner of war camp in Germany
 Transcription factor II B, a type of protein structure
 Type IIb diamond, a classification of natural diamonds
 Type IIB string theory, a physical theory about the basic substance of the universe
 II-b or IIb, a subtype of Type II supernova

See also
 B2 (disambiguation)
 IIB (disambiguation)